The 2011 NPF Draft is the eighth annual NPF Draft.  It was held March 18, 2011 8:00 PM EST in Orlando, FL at the Amway Center for the 2011 season.  It was streamed live on the Major League Baseball's website MLB.com.  The first selection was Alabama's Kelsi Dunne, picked by the NPF Diamonds.  Athletes are not allowed by the NCAA to sign professional contracts until their collegiate seasons have ended.

2011 NPF Draft
Position key: 
C = Catcher; UT = Utility infielder; INF = Infielder; 1B = First base; 2B =Second base SS = Shortstop; 3B = Third base; OF = Outfielder; RF = Right field; CF = Center field; LF = Left field;  P = Pitcher; RHP = right-handed Pitcher; LHP = left-handed Pitcher; DP =Designated player
Positions are listed as combined for those who can play multiple positions.

Round 1

Round 2

Round 3

Round 4

Round 5

Draft notes

References 

2011 in softball
National Pro Fastpitch drafts